Below is a list of lists of schools in Australia:

By type
 List of government schools in Australia
 List of non-government schools in Australia
 List of religious schools in Australia
 List of Christian schools in Australia
 List of Adventist schools in Australia
 List of Anglican schools in Australia
 List of Baptist schools in Australia
 List of Catholic schools in Australia
 List of Eastern Orthodox schools in Australia
 List of Lutheran schools in Australia
 List of non-denominational Christian schools in Australia
 List of Uniting Church schools in Australia
 List of Methodist schools in Australia
 List of Presbyterian schools in Australia
 List of Islamic schools in Australia
 List of Jewish schools in Australia
 List of Montessori schools in Australia

By state or territory

Australian Capital Territory
 List of schools in the Australian Capital Territory

New South Wales
 Lists of schools in New South Wales

By regions in New South Wales
 List of schools in Greater Western Sydney
 List of schools in Hunter and the Central Coast
 List of schools in Illawarra and the South East (New South Wales)
 List of schools in Northern Rivers and Mid North Coast
 List of schools in Tamworth, New South Wales

By type in New South Wales
 List of government schools in New South Wales
 List of selective high schools in New South Wales
 List of non-government schools in New South Wales
 List of Catholic schools in New South Wales
 List of Anglican schools in New South Wales
 List of Islamic schools in New South Wales

Northern Territory
 List of schools in the Northern Territory

Queensland
 Lists of schools in Queensland

By regions in Queensland
 List of schools in Greater Brisbane
 List of schools in Gold Coast, Queensland
 List of schools in Sunshine Coast, Queensland
 List of schools in West Moreton
 List of schools in Darling Downs
 List of schools in Wide Bay–Burnett
 List of schools in Central Queensland
 List of schools in North Queensland
 List of schools in Far North Queensland

South Australia
 List of schools in South Australia

Tasmania
 List of schools in Tasmania

Victoria
 List of schools in Victoria

By type in Victoria
 List of government schools in Victoria
 List of non-government schools in Victoria

Western Australia
 List of schools in Western Australia

By region in Western Australia
 List of schools in the Perth metropolitan area
 List of schools in rural Western Australia

See also 

 Education in Australia
 List of universities in Australia
 List of boarding schools in Australia